Cordrazine may refer to:
A fictional drug in Star Trek, Earth: Final Conflict and the Mission:  Impossible television series.
Cordrazine (band), an Australian musical group.